Odishi Saint Constantine Church is a church in the village of Odishi, Sokhumi municipality, Autonomous Republic of Abkhazia, Georgia.

History 
The church was built in the Middle Ages.

References 

Religious buildings and structures in Georgia (country)
Religious buildings and structures in Abkhazia
Churches in Abkhazia